Stanley's brush-furred rat (Lophuromys stanleyi) is a species of brush-furred mouse found in Uganda and the Democratic Republic of Congo.

References

Lophuromys
Mammals described in 2007